Aleksandr Karapetyan (born 23 December 1987) is an Armenian professional footballer who plays as a forward.

Club career
Karapetyan began his playing career in the German fourth-tier Regionalliga with Wehen Wiesbaden II, FC Oberneuland, SV 07 Elversberg and FC 08 Homburg. In 2013, he moved to F91 Dudelange of the Luxembourg National Division, and then on to CS Grevenmacher before returning to F91.

At the end of the 2014–15 Luxembourg National Division, his contract expired and he considered offers from China and Armenia but opted to remain in Western Europe, having trials at Germany's FC Erzgebirge Aue and SSV Jahn Regensburg before signing for FC Victoria Rosport in January 2016.

In May 2017, he signed a two-year contract with the option of a third at FC Progrès Niederkorn.

On 12 July 2019, he signed a contract with Russian Premier League newcomer PFC Sochi. He left Sochi on 31 July 2020.

On 3 August 2020, Karapetyan signed a two-year contract with FC Tambov, also in Russia's top flight.

On 9 February 2021, Karapetyan signed for Armenian champions Ararat-Armenia.

Karapetyan left Ararat-Armenia on 7 June 2021, signing for Noah the following day. Karapetyan left Noah after his contract was terminated by mutual consent on 29 December 2021.

On 2 September 2022, Karapetyan joined Pyunik and then left the club at the end of 2022.

International career
He made his debut for the Armenia national football team in the UEFA Euro 2016 qualifying on 11 October 2014, replacing Marcos Pizzelli for the last six minutes of a 1–1 draw with Serbia at the Republican Stadium in Yerevan, one minute after Pizzelli's penalty was saved by Vladimir Stojković.

After over four years without a cap, Karapetyan was recalled in November 2018 ahead of UEFA Nations League away games at Gibraltar and Liechtenstein. He scored his first international goal to complete a 6–2 UEFA Nations League win against the former on 16 November, and struck again three days later to ensure a 2–2 draw against the latter.

In June 2019, Karapetyan scored in consecutive games to win UEFA Euro 2020 qualifiers against Liechtenstein and Greece. On 5 August that year, he netted again to give Armenia a surprise lead at home to Italy in the next game of the campaign, but was sent off before half time in a 3–1 loss.

Career statistics

Club

International

Scores and results list Armenia's goal tally first, score column indicates score after each Karapetyan goal.

References

External links

Living people
1987 births
Footballers from Tbilisi
Georgian people of Armenian descent
Citizens of Armenia through descent
Armenian footballers
Association football forwards
Armenia international footballers
SV Wehen Wiesbaden II players
F91 Dudelange players
CS Grevenmacher players
FC Victoria Rosport players
FC Progrès Niederkorn players
PFC Sochi players
FC Tambov players
FC Ararat-Armenia players
FC Noah players
FC Pyunik players
Russian Premier League players
Armenian Premier League players
Armenian expatriate footballers
Armenian expatriate sportspeople in Germany
Expatriate footballers in Germany
Armenian expatriate sportspeople in Luxembourg
Expatriate footballers in Luxembourg
Armenian expatriate sportspeople in Russia
Expatriate footballers in Russia